This is a list of wineries, breweries, cideries, meaderies, and distilleries in the state of New Jersey in the United States.  , there are 51 wineries, 114 breweries, 18 brewpubs, 22 distilleries, 3 cideries and 1 meadery that are licensed and in operation within the state. The following lists do not include producers which are no longer in business, or those that are in the process of being established.

History
Alcoholic beverages (i.e., beer, wine, and spirits) have been produced in New Jersey since the colonial era. The first brewery in New Jersey was established in a fledgling Dutch settlement in what is now Hoboken when the state was part the Dutch New Netherlands colony. It was short-lived and destroyed by a band of Lenape in 1643 during Governor Kieft's War (1643-1645). The production of beer in New Jersey ranges from large international conglomerates like Anheuser-Busch to microbreweries producing smaller quantities using artisanal methods. The industrial northeastern corner of the state has historically been a major beer-production region, and the majority of New Jersey's breweries and brewpubs are in that region. Laird & Company, founded around 1780 in the village of Scobeyville in Colts Neck, is the oldest licensed distillery in the United States, having received license No. 1 from the Department of the Treasury.

Wine grapes were planted by the early settlers of New Jersey, and some of the current wineries were established in locations where wine grapes were already present. In 1767, the Royal Society of Arts in London praised two wines made on New Jersey plantations for making fine quality products derived from colonial agriculture. The oldest, continuously-operated winery in the state, Renault Winery, was established in 1864.

The production of wine in New Jersey largely consists of small farm wineries. Because of its sandy soil and warmer climate, the majority of the state's wineries are located in South Jersey's Outer Coastal Plain Viticultural Area.  A handful of wineries are in western New Jersey's Warren Hills Viticultural Area. Part of the Central Delaware Valley Viticultural Area is in New Jersey, but no New Jersey wineries are currently in this viticultural area.

New Jersey wineries produce wine from more than 90 varieties of grapes, and from over 25 other fruits.

Until the 1980s, prohibition-era laws severely restricted the number of wineries, breweries, and distilleries in the state. In 1981, the New Jersey Farm Winery Act exempted low-volume family-owned wineries from the restrictions, and allowed wineries to create outlet stores. Likewise, New Jersey created a limited brewery license for microbreweries and a restricted brewery license for brewpubs. In 1995, the Ship Inn in Milford became the first brewpub in New Jersey since Prohibition. In 2012, New Jersey liberalized its licensing laws to allow microbreweries to sell beer by the glass as part of a tour, and sell up to 15.5 gallons (i.e., a keg) for off-premises consumption. The same legislation permits brewpubs to brew up to 10,000 barrels of beer per year, and sell to wholesalers and at festivals. In 2013, New Jersey issued the first new distillery license since Prohibition to Jersey Artisan Distilling, and passed a law creating a craft distillery license. In 2017, New Jersey passed a law creating a cidery and meadery license.

List of producers
The following is a list of wineries, breweries, and distilleries in New Jersey, including the town and county where the establishment is located, the year when the business first sold to the public wine, beer, or liquor that it produces, the type of ABC license that the business has, and the number of cases or barrels produced annually. For wineries, the table also lists the AVA that the winery is located in, the year grapes were first planted for commercial use, and the number of acres planted with grapes. The town listed is based on the establishment's physical address, which may differ from its mailing address.

Wineries
American Viticultural Areas (AVAs):

 CMP = Cape May Peninsula AVA
 CDV = Central Delaware Valley AVA
 OCP = Outer Coastal Plain AVA
 WH = Warren Hills AVA
 None = not in a recognized AVA

Licenses: 

 Farm = Farm winery license
 Plenary = Plenary winery license

Breweries

Licenses: 
 Plenary = Plenary brewing license (macrobrewery)
 Limited = Limited brewing license (microbrewery/craft brewery)
 Restricted = Restricted brewing license (brewpub)

Distilleries
Licenses:

 Plenary = Plenary distillery license
 Limited = Limited distilling license
 Craft = Craft distilling license
Rectifier = Rectifier and blender license

See also

 Alcohol laws of New Jersey
 Beer in New Jersey
 Beer in the United States
 Garden State Wine Growers Association
 Judgment of Princeton
 List of breweries in the United States
 List of microbreweries
 New Jersey distilled spirits
 New Jersey Division of Alcoholic Beverage Control
 New Jersey wine
 New Jersey Wine Industry Advisory Council

References

Further reading 
 Bryson, Lew and Mark Haynie. New Jersey Breweries. (Mechanicsburg, PA: Stackpole, 2008). .
 Jackson, Bart. Garden State Wineries Guide. (South San Francisco, CA: Wine Appreciation Guild, 2011). .
 Pellegrino, Michael. Jersey Brew: The Story of Beer in New Jersey.  (Wantage, NJ: Pellegrino & Feldstein, 2009). .
 Schmidt, R. Marilyn. Wines and Wineries of New Jersey. (Chatsworth, NJ: Pine Barrens Press, 1999). .
 Westrich, Sal. New Jersey Wine: A Remarkable History. (Charleston, SC: The History Press, 2012). .

External links 
 Garden State Wine Growers Association
 Garden State Craft Brewers Guild
 Listing and Map of Wineries and Vineyards in Hunterdon County and Neighboring Areas
 Listing and Map of Breweries and Microbreweries in Hunterdon County and Neighboring Areas
 Listing and Map of Distilleries in Hunterdon County and Neighboring Areas

New Jersey

New Jersey
New Jersey culture

Tourism in New Jersey

New Jersey
Wineries